Garrett W. Johnson (born May 24, 1984) is an American entrepreneur and award-winning shot putter. Johnson won the 2006 NCAA Indoor and Outdoor Shot Put Championship, and was also named a Rhodes Scholar in 2006 on behalf of the United States. He currently serves as executive director of the Lincoln Network.

Career
Upon graduation from Oxford, Johnson served as a staffer for the Senate's Committee on Foreign Relations.

In 2011, along with Ash Rust and John Fallone, Johnson co-founded SendHub a text message marketing company.

In 2014, Johnson co-founded the Lincoln Network, a 501(c)(3) nonprofit.

Academic
Garrett Johnson was the salutatorian in the 2002 graduating class at Tampa Baptist Academy in Tampa, Florida, where he won multiple state championships.

Johnson was a student in the FSU Center for Academic Retention and Enhancement (CARE), beginning in the Summer of 2002.  He attended FSU, graduating magna cum laude in three years with a double major in Political Science and English. Johnson was named an academic All-American in 2005 and 2006 and earned the Florida State Golden Torch Award given to the FSU student-athlete with the highest GPA. Johnson, a scholar athlete, was named to the FSU Dean's list with a 3.5 GPA or better and the FSU President's list with a 4.0 GPA throughout his undergraduate career.

Johnson completed a master's degree in migration studies as a 2006 Rhodes Scholar at Exeter College, Oxford University.

Track and field
 Shot Put
 2006, NCAA Indoor National Champion (Shot Put)
 2006, NCAA Outdoor National Champion (Shot Put)

Johnson was coached by Harlis Meaders.  Johnson was a finalist in the 2008 USA Track & Field Olympic Trials, but failed to post a mark, fouling on all attempts.

Personal life
Johnson resides in Florida and has been married since 2014. He serves on the board of directors of the Foundation for Florida's Future. Additionally, he is an advisor for the Cicero Institute, and a Steering Committee Member of the Tech Talent Project.

Awards
 2004 Seminole Impact Award
 2004–2005 ESPN The Magazine Second-Team Academic All America
 2005 Arthur Ashe Jr. Sports Scholar
 2005–2006 ESPN The Magazine University Academic All American of the Year
 2005–2006 ESPN The Magazine First-Team Academic All America
 2006 Rhodes Scholar
 2006 USTFCCCA Division I National Outdoor Men's Field Co-Athlete of the Year
 2007 Inaugural Frank Dolson/Penn Relays Award

References

External links
 
 Garrett Johnson's Official USA Track & Field Page

1984 births
African-American male track and field athletes
American Rhodes Scholars
American male shot putters
Florida State Seminoles men's track and field athletes
Living people
21st-century African-American sportspeople
20th-century African-American people